Pharaonella is a genus of bivalves belonging to the family Tellinidae.

The species of this genus are found in Southern Hemisphere.

Species:

Pharaonella amanyu 
Pharaonella astula 
Pharaonella aurea 
Pharaonella cuspis 
Pharaonella dialeuca 
Pharaonella miles 
Pharaonella pharaonis 
Pharaonella semilaevis 
Pharaonella sieboldii 
Pharaonella venusta 
Pharaonella wallaceae

References

Tellinidae
Bivalve genera